Chapel Hill High School is a public high school in Douglasville, Georgia, United States.  It is known for its strong academic performance and athletic teams.

History
Chapel Hill High School opened for the 1999–2000 school year. It was the fourth high school to open in the Douglas County School District, due to the overcrowding of Alexander, Douglas County, and Lithia Springs High Schools.

Curriculum
Chapel Hill High School is known for strong academic performance. CHHS met AYP for the 2007–2008 school year. In 2005, 72% of the student body passed the science section of the GHSGT (Georgia High School Graduation Test), 96% passed the English section, and 95% passed the math section, compared with statewide averages of 68%, 95%, and 92% percent, respectively. Chapel Hill also offers a variety of Advanced Placement courses, the largest amount of any high school in the county, followed closely by Alexander High.

Chapel Hill offers the following Advanced Placement courses:
AP U.S. History
AP World History
AP Psychology
AP European History
AP Calculus AB
AP Microeconomics
AP Physics B
AP Chemistry
AP Biology
AP U.S. Government & Politics
AP Art History
AP Statistics
AP French Language
AP Spanish Language
AP English Language & Composition
AP English Literature & Composition

Notable alumni

Cam Gill - Linebacker for the Tampa Bay Buccaneers

References

External links
Chapel Hill High School
Chapel Hill High football team
Chapel Hill High School Panther Band
Douglas County, Georgia

Educational institutions established in 1999
Public high schools in Georgia (U.S. state)
Schools in Douglas County, Georgia
1999 establishments in Georgia (U.S. state)